The Microdrive is a registered trademark for miniature, 1-inch hard disks produced by IBM and Hitachi.  These rotational media storage devices were designed to fit in CompactFlash (CF) Type II slots. The release of similar drives by other makers led to them often being referred to as "microdrives" too. By 2010, Microdrives were viewed as obsolete, having been overtaken by solid-state flash media in read/write performance, storage capacity, durability, and price.

History
Prior to the 1-inch Microdrive, a 1.3-inch HDD nicknamed the "Kittyhawk" was developed and launched in June 1992 by Hewlett Packard with a capacity of 20, then later 40 MB. These units weighed about 28g (1oz), with dimensions of 2.0" × 1.44" × 0.414" (50.8mm × 36.5mm × 10.5mm) and were the physically smallest hard drives in the world before the Microdrive. The Kittyhawk was a failure however, and didn't last long in the market.

Development 
The idea of the Microdrive was created by IBM researcher Timothy J. Reiley who was working at the Almaden Research Center in San Jose. He wanted to create a small form factor hard disk drive with high capacity storage that would be used for mobile devices, after working on a project to look at Micromechanics. Originally Timothy planned for the drive to use Microelectromechanical systems for parts of the drive such as the spindle motor and head actuator. Thomas R. Albrecht, another researcher, collaborated with Timothy to design and create the drive. Thomas changed the drive technology to miniaturized conventional technologies instead due to the increased technical risk and costs of using Microelectromechanical systems.

The leader of mobile drive development at IBM's Fujisawa facility at the time, Hideya Ino, highly sought the potential of a 1-inch disk drive. He had a team collaborate with the IBM researchers to create working prototypes. Those prototypes were then used to persuade product planning and marketing teams to support the project. Two notable people from the Japan development team were Mitsuhiko Aoyagi and Kenji Kuroki, who contributed to launching the product line. Bill Healey and John Osterhout worked at the storage technology division in San Jose and were responsible for the business development and marketing of the Microdrive.

Introduction 
In September 1998, IBM announced the Microdrive in North America. It was advertised as being about the size of a large coin, weighing less than an AA battery, and the capacity of over 200 floppy disks. The Microdrive was expected to be available by mid-1999. 

On June 24, 1999, IBM Japan announced the IBM Microdrive 340 MB for ¥58,000 or $475 USD. It was planned to be marketed as a storage device for digital cameras and other handheld devices.

On August 24, 1999, Microtech International announced they would be the first North American distributor of the 340 MB Microdrive.

In June 1999, IBM launched the first generation 1-inch Microdrive. It had storage capacities of 170MB and 340MB at a price of $499.  The physical dimensions of Microdrive were 1.65" × 1.42" × 0.197" (42.0mm × 36.0mm × 5.0mm) and conformed to CompactFlash Type II card standard.  A second generation of Microdrive was announced by IBM in June 2000 with increased capacities at 512MB and 1GB, with the 512 MB model costing $399 and the 1 GB model costing $499. 

Following the merger of IBM and Hitachi HDD business units, Hitachi Global Storage Technologies continued the development and marketing of the Microdrive. In 2003, 2GB and 4GB models were announced by Hitachi. The 4 GB model was first available on February 20, 2004 for a price of $499. This was followed by a 6GB capacity model in February 2005 for a price of $299, with the 4 GB model dropping to $199. Hitachi additionally planned an even smaller 1-inch hard drive with a capacity of 8-10 GB under the code-name "Mikey" for late 2005 with a weight of 14 grams and a size of 40 mm × 30 mm × 5 mm.

By 2007, sales and profit of the Microdrive were dwindling so Hitachi discontinued production of 1 inch hard disk drives. Sales of 1-inch drives were only about 3,000 in a three-month period in 2007, while 560,000 units of 1-1.8-inch drives were sold throughout July to September 2007. Hitachi wanted to shift over to bigger 2.5 and 3.5-inch hard disk drives, rather than retain focus on the small hard disk drive business.

Seagate 

In 2004, Seagate launched 2.5 and 5GB hard disk drives in the same small physical form-factor as IBM Microdrive and referred to them as either 1-inch hard drives or CompactFlash hard drives due to the trademark issue. These drives were also commonly known as the Seagate ST1. In 2005 Seagate launched an 8GB model. Seagate also sold a standalone consumer product based on these drives with a product known as the Pocket Hard Drive. These devices came in the shape of a hockey puck with an integrated USB 2.0 cable.

Seagate launched their 6 GB mini drive on the same day as Hitachi, in February 2005.

Western Digital 
In early 2005 Western Digital announced they would be joining the mini hard drive market with their own drives. These would be available by the second half of 2005 and reach capacities up to 6 GB.

Western Digital launched a 6 GB external USB 2.0 microdrive as a part of the Passport Pocket brand in March 2006. This was made as a competitor to the Seagate Pocket Hard Drive. The unit had 2 MB of cache, 11 ms seek, spun at 3,600 RPM, and was 60 × 45 × 9 mm. The price for the unit was $130 upon release.

GS Magicstor 
On July 16, 2003, a Chinese manufacturer called GS Magicstor, Inc. (subsidiary of GS Magic, Inc.) announced it had produced 1-inch hard disk drive with capacity of 2.4GB at the beginning of the year 2003, originally marketed as an alternative to Microdrive by Hitachi Global Storage Technologies. It was to be followed by 2.2 and 4.8GB 1-inch HDD that was unveiled in 2004 International CES, with 0.8-inch HDD. On December 28, 2004, Hitachi Global Storage Technologies announced it had filed lawsuit against GS Magicstor, Inc., GS Magic, Inc., and Riospring, Inc. for infringement of multiple Hitachi GST's patents relating to hard disk drives, after GS Magic Inc. had started promoting mini-HDD (small form factor hard disk drive).

Discontinuation 
By 2006, flash-based CompactFlash cards surpassed Microdrives in maximum size and over time became less expensive as well, which rendered the technology obsolete. As of July 2012, there are no known manufacturers of 1-inch form-factor harddisk drives. Hitachi had also stopped production of its trademarked Microdrive product.

Microdrive models by timeline

Date of release of large sizes.

Advantages
 Until 2006, Microdrives had higher capacity than CompactFlash cards.
 Microdrives allowed more write cycles, making them suitable for use as swap space in embedded applications.
 Microdrives were better at handling power loss in the middle of writing. Flash storage always needs to move some old data around while writing, to ensure the flash's finite write life is consumed equally; a bug in the wear levelling algorithm would cause data loss if the card were unplugged at the exact wrong time. Data on rotational disks is modified in place, and hard drive algorithms at the time were much more advanced than those of flash storage.
 Weighed less than a roll of 35mm film for cameras.
 Stored thousands of images (for cameras of that time). 
 Sometimes sold with a PCMCIA adapter for laptops. 
 A 4GB Microdrive is around 2700 1.44 MB floppy disks.

Disadvantages
 As of 2006, Microdrive's capacity advantages were exceeded by CompactFlash cards (which are the same size and are often compatible with each other), and USB flash drives.  As of 5 July 2015, 512GB CF cards are available, offering 42 times the storage space of the largest Microdrive.
 Being mechanical devices, they are more sensitive to physical shock and temperature changes than flash memory, though in practice they are very robust, and manufacturers have added several features to the more recent models to improve reliability. For example, a microdrive will generally not survive a 4-foot (1.2-meter) drop onto a hard surface whereas CF cards can survive much higher falls.
 Microdrives are not as fast as the high-end CompactFlash cards; they generally operate at around 4–6 megabytes per second while high-end CF cards can operate at 45 megabytes per second. This may cause problems for photographers who shoot sequences of large images in rapid succession. Also, they require some time to spin up when they have been idle (see below).
 They are not designed to operate at high altitudes (over 10,000 feet or 3,000 meters) but can be safely used on most commercial aircraft as cabins are generally pressurized.
 Only high-capacity models are manufactured, as it is not profitable to make low-capacity Microdrives. At the end of 2005 only capacities above 2GB are manufactured while 256MB and 512MB CompactFlash cards were still in production. Lower capacities are still readily available second hand on eBay but these are usually the same price as CF cards of the same size.
 Unlike flash storage, Microdrives require power even when no data is being transferred to or read from them, just to keep the disk spinning in order to maintain quick access. As a result, many devices such as the iPod mini leave the drive switched off for most of the time while periodically starting it up to fetch data from it to fill the device's buffer. Microdrives will switch off after idling for more than a few seconds to counter this problem; however, this means that it needs to spin up for the next access, which takes about 1s. This effect would be particularly problematic if an operating system is being run from the drive, as seen in the case of the Palm LifeDrive.
 Since they are thicker than flash-based CF cards, Microdrives require a Type II slot. Many newer compact cameras only have a Type I slot due to the increasing popularity of flash-based cards, so Microdrives have limited popularity outside of the professional photography market.
 Certain bus-powered CF card readers lack the power needed to run a Microdrive although they do take CF II cards. When using such a device, it will usually be detected by the host, but errors will occur once the user attempts to access the drive.
 Some "OEM Only" drives use the CompactFlash form factor but only provide a 5V IDE/ATA interface. These will not work in readers or devices which expect a 3.3V interface and full CompactFlash functionality.

Microdrive models by manufacturer

IBM Microdrive
 170 MB
 340 MB
 512 MB
 1 GB
 4 GB
 8 GB
 16 GB

Several physical examples of Microdrives are held by the Computer History Museum.

Hitachi Microdrive
 512 MB
 1 GB
 2 GB
 3 GB
 4 GB
 5 GB
 6 GB
 8 GB
IBM and Hitachi models were fitted with 128KB of cache memory.

GS Magicstor
 2.2 GB ATA, USB (NATIVE), & CF variants
 3 GB ATA
 4 GB ATA & CF variants
 6 GB

Seagate ST1
 2.5 GB
 4 GB
 5 GB
 6 GB
 8 GB
 12 GB
These Seagate models were fitted with 2MB of cache memory.

Sony Compact Vault
 2 GB (rebadged Hitachi)
 4 GB (rebadged Hitachi)
 5 GB (rebadged Seagate)
 8 GB (rebadged Seagate)

Toshiba
 2 GB
 4 GB

Cornice
 2 GB
 4 GB
 8 GB

Western Digital
 6 GB

See also
 Digital camera
 Hard disk drive
 HP Kittyhawk microdrive

References

External links
 IBM family of Microdrives - HGST
 Review: IBM's 1GB Microdrive – review on MP3 Newswire
 Hitachi Global Storage Technologies (HGST)
 Review of Seagate ST1 5GB 1-inch hard disk for CF

Hard disk drives
Divested IBM products
Hitachi
IBM storage devices
Computer-related introductions in 1999